The Microregion of Auriflama is located on the northwest of São Paulo state, Brazil, and is made up of 9 municipalities. It belongs to the Mesoregion of São José do Rio Preto.

The microregion has a population of 46,367 inhabitants, in an area of 2,312.2 km²

Municipalities 
The microregion consists of the following municipalities, listed below with their 2010 Census populations (IBGE/2010):

Auriflama: 14,202
Floreal: 3,003
Gastão Vidigal: 4,193
General Salgado: 10,699
Guzolândia: 4,754
Magda: 3,200
Nova Castilho: 1,125
Nova Luzitânia: 3,441
São João de Iracema: 1,780

References

Auriflama